This is a list of live action lesbian characters in television (includes TV movies and web series). The orientation can be portrayed on-screen, described in the dialogue or mentioned. Roles include lead, main, recurring, supporting, and guest.

The names are organized in alphabetical order by the surname (i.e. last name), or by a single name if the character does not have a surname. Some naming customs write the family name first followed by the given name; in these cases, the names in the list appear under the family name (e.g. Jung Seo-hyun [Korean] is organized alphabetically under "J").



List

Notes

See also

 List of dramatic television series with LGBT characters: 1960s–2000s
 List of dramatic television series with LGBT characters: 2010s
 List of dramatic television series with LGBT characters: 2020s
 List of comedy television series with LGBT characters
 List of made-for-television films with LGBT characters
 List of soap operas with LGBT characters
 List of reality television programs with LGBT cast members
 List of LGBT characters in radio and podcasts
 List of LGBT characters

References

Parenthetical

Further reading
 
 
 
 
 
 
 

Lesbianism-related lists
Lists of character lists
Lists of entertainment lists
Lesbian in television
Lesbian characters
LGBT